The shapar (shabr) is a type of bagpipe of the Chuvash people of the Volga Region of Russia. The bag is usually made of a bladder; the pipe has a double-chanter bored into a single block of wood. The pipes were, until recently, played for weddings.

References

Chuvash people
Russian musical instruments
Bagpipes